Ligonier is a city in Perry Township, Noble County, in the U.S. state of Indiana. The population was 4,405 at the 2010 census.

History
Ligonier was platted in 1835. The city was named after the Pennsylvanian borough of the same name. A post office has been in operation at Ligonier since 1848.

In 1940, a post office mural was completed by Fay E. Davis as a work commissioned through the federal Section of Painting and Sculpture, later called the Section of Fine Arts, of the Treasury Department. The mural, Cutting Timber, depicts lumberjacks felling trees and removing them by oxcart.

The Ahavas Shalom Reform Temple, Ligonier Historic District, and Jacob Straus House are listed on the National Register of Historic Places.

Geography
Ligonier is located at  (41.464247, -85.591258).

Demographics

2010 census
As of the census of 2010, there were 4,405 people, 1,333 households, and 978 families living in the city. The racial makeup of the city was 69.6% White, 0.4% African American, 0.2% Native American, 0.5% Asian, 26.6% from other races, and 2.7% from two or more races. Hispanic or Latino of any race were 51.5% of the population.

There were 1,333 households, of which 49.3% had children under the age of 18 living with them, 52.5% were married couples living together, 14.8% had a female householder with no husband present, 6.1% had a male householder with no wife present, and 26.6% were non-families. 22.1% of all households were made up of individuals, and 8.4% had someone living alone who was 65 years of age or older. The average household size was 3.26 and the average family size was 3.83.

The median age in the city was 28.5 years. 34.7% of residents were under the age of 18; 9.6% were between the ages of 18 and 24; 28.3% were from 25 to 44; 19.5% were from 45 to 64; and 8% were 65 years of age or older. The gender makeup of the city was 49.8% male and 50.2% female.

2000 census
As of the census of 2000, there were 4,357 people, 1,390 households, and 1,021 families living in the city. The racial makeup of the city was 73.24% White, 0.53% African American, 0.16% Native American, 0.41% Asian, 24.70% from other races, and 0.96% from two or more races. Hispanic or Latino of any race were 33.30% of the population.

There were 1,390 households, out of which 39.3% had children under the age of 18 living with them, 53.7% were married couples living together, 12.6% had a female householder with no husband present, and 26.5% were non-families. 21.4% of all households were made up of individuals, and 9.6% had someone living alone who was 65 years of age or older. The average household size was 3.08 and the average family size was 3.52.

In the city, the population was spread out, with 31.4% under the age of 18, 13.0% from 18 to 24, 28.2% from 25 to 44, 17.2% from 45 to 64, and 10.3% who were 65 years of age or older. The median age was 28 years. For every 100 females, there were 103.7 males. For every 100 females age 18 and over, there were 102.2 males.

The median income for a household in the city was $36,546, and the median income for a family was $42,757. Males had a median income of $31,596 versus $23,938 for females. The per capita income for the city was $14,448. About 7.5% of families and 14.3% of the population were below the poverty line, including 17.7% of those under age 18 and 6.0% of those age 65 or over.

Education
Ligonier is serviced by the West Noble School Corporation which maintains four schools at two locations in and around Ligonier.

West Noble Primary School serves students in Kindergarten & 1st Grade. It is located at 500 West Union Street.

West Noble Elementary School is located on the WNSC campus south of Ligonier on US-33. Grades 2-4 students who live outside Ligonier city limits attend WNES.

West Noble Middle School is located on the WNSC campus south of Ligonier on US-33.  This building has grades 5–8.

West Noble High School is located on the WNSC campus south of Ligonier on US-33.  All students grades 9-12 from Ligonier and the surrounding area attend this facility.

The town has a lending library, the Ligonier Public Library.

Newspaper
The Advance Leader, serving western Noble County, Ind., became part of KPC Media Group Inc. in May 1975. The weekly Cromwell Advance, founded in 1912 by Forrest Robbins, was purchased from Jim and Greta Wallace. The weekly Ligonier Leader, founded in 1880 by E.G. Thompson, was purchased from Norm Davis. The two mastheads were merged to form The Advance Leader, with the first issue published on May 14, 1975. The first co-editors were David Kurtz and Grace Witwer Housholder. The editor and general manager today is Robert Buttgen, who joined KPC in 1996. The newspaper is published by KPC Media Group, with its website at kpcnews.com

Marshmallow Capital
According to the National Confectioners Association, Ligonier is the marshmallow capital of the world.

Notable people

Dwight H. Green, former Governor of Illinois
Uriel Macias, retired professional soccer player

Douglas Rex, past president of American College of Gastroenterology
Glen Steele, retired professional football player, attended West Noble High School, University of Michigan, NFL Cincinnati Bengals

References

External links

City of Ligonier, Indiana website
Noble County Convention and Visitors Bureau
Operation Foundation Volunteer Project

Cities in Indiana
Populated places established in 1835
Cities in Noble County, Indiana
1835 establishments in Indiana